Hà Nội (HQ-182) is a  of the Vietnam People's Navy. She is the first of six Kilo-class submarines in service with Vietnam.

References 

2012 ships
Kilo-class submarines
Attack submarines
Submarines of the Vietnam People's Navy